Ansty is a village in Dorset, England, north of Cheselbourne and west of Milton Abbas. It consists of the settlements of Higher Ansty, Lower Ansty, Pleck (also known as Little Ansty) and Ansty Cross. The Hall & Woodhouse brewing company founded a brewery in the village in 1777, and brewing continued here until the 1940s. The village hall used to be a brewery building, and the old malthouse became Malthouse Cottages.

Notes

External links

Villages in Dorset